The 322d Expeditionary Reconnaissance Squadron is a provisional unit of the United States Air Force, assigned to Air Combat Command to activate or inactivate as needed.

The squadron was first activated in 1942 as the 322d Bombardment Squadron.  After training in the United States, it moved to the European Theater of Operations, where it participated in the strategic bombing campaign against Germany.  It was awarded two Distinguished Unit Citations for combat in Germany.  Following V-E Day, the squadron returned to the United States and was inactivated in late 1945.

The squadron was redesignated the 322d Strategic Reconnaissance Squadron and activated at Barksdale Air Force Base, Louisiana in 1950.  Squadron elements deployed and again saw combat during the Korean War.  It was inactivated at Lockbourne Air Force Base, Ohio in 1957.  In 1963, it returned to the bombardment role at Glasgow Air Force Base, Montana.  It deployed crews and aircraft to Andersen Air Force Base, which participated in the Vietnam War. The squadron was inactivated on 25 June 1968 as Glasgow closed and older models of the Boeing B-52 Stratofortress were withdrawn from service.

History

World War II

Organization and training in the United States
The squadron was first activated on 15 April 1942 at Harding Field as the 322nd Bombardment Squadron, one of the three original bombardment squadrons of the 91st Bombardment Group. It was equipped with the Boeing B-17 Flying Fortress. It completed First Phase training at MacDill Field under Third Air Force, with Second and Third Phase training at Walla Walla Army Air Field under Second Air Force in Washington. The air echelon moved to Gowen Field, Idaho on 24 August 1942, and began receiving new B-17s there. It becan flying them from Dow Field, Maine in September, although it was not fully equipped with new aircraft until October.

Combat in Europe
The ground echelon was established temporarily at RAF Kimbolton by 13 September 1942.  However, the runways at Kimbolton were not up to handling heavy bombers, and the unit moved to what would be its permanent station in the European Theater of Operations, RAF Bassingbourn, on 14 October 1942.  Bassingbourn had been a prewar Royal Air Force station, so the squadron found itself in more comfortable quarters than most of its contemporaries.  The squadron primarily engaged in the strategic bombing campaign against Germany, and flew its first mission on 7 November, an attack against submarine pens at Brest, France.

Until the middle of 1943, The squadron concentrated its attacks on naval targets, including submarine pens, dockyards, ship construction facilities and harbors, although it also struck airfields, factories, and communications facilities.  On 27 January 1943, the unit attacked the Kriegsmarine yard at Wilhelmshaven as part of the first penetration by bombers of VIII Bomber Command to a target in Germany.  On 4 March 1943, it attacked marshalling yards at Hamm, Germany despite adverse weather and heavy enemy opposition.  For this action, it was awarded its first Distinguished Unit Citation (DUC).

From the middle of 1943 to the end of the war, the squadron concentrated on attacks on German aviation, including attacks on aircraft factories, including ones at Oranienburg and Brussels; airfields at Oldenburg and Villacoublay; the ball bearing plants at Schweinfurt; chemical plants at Leverkusen and Peenemunde; and industrial facilities in Ludwigshafen, Frankfurt am Main and Wilhemshaven.  As part of this attack on the German aircraft industry, on 11 January, the squadron penetrated into central Germany, despite bad weather, poor fighter cover, and strong attacks by enemy interceptor aircraft, the unit succeeded in bombing its target, earning a second DUC.

The squadron also performed interdiction and air support missions.  It helped prepare for Operation Overlord, the invasion of Normandy, by bombing gun emplacements and troop concentrations near the beachhead area.  It aided Operation Cobra, the breakout at Saint Lo, in July 1944 by attacking enemy troop positions.  It supported troops on the front lines near Caen in August 1944 and attacked lines of communications near the battlefield during the Battle of the Bulge in December 1944 and January 1945.  It attacked airfields, bridges, and railroads to support Operation Lumberjack, the push across the Rhine in Germany, in 1945.

Following V-E Day, the squadron evacuated prisoners of war from German camps. The first B-17 left Bassingbourn for the United States on 27 May 1945. The squadron was reestablished at Drew Field, Florida in early July, with the intention of deploying it to the Pacific, but it was not fully manned or equipped, and inactivated on 7 November 1945.

Cold War

Strategic reconnaissance

The squadron was redesignated the 322d Strategic Reconnaissance Squadron and activated at Barksdale Air Force Base, Louisiana in July 1950 as a result of the Korean War.   The squadron was initially equipped with RB-29 reconnaissance bombers, but soon converted to the North American RB-45 Tornado jet reconnaissance aircraft.  Elements of the squadron flew reconnaissance and mapping combat missions over Korea until mid-1952.  The squadron deployed to Johnson Air Base and Yokota Air Base, Japan from activation until 28 May 1952.  In September 1951 the squadron moved to Lockbourne Air Force Base, Ohio, where it re-equipped with Boeing RB-47E Stratojets.  The squadron performed various worldwide reconnaissance missions until inactivating in November 1957.

Strategic bombardment
Once again designated as a bombardment squadron, the 322d was activated in February 1963 at Glasgow Air Force Base, Montana, where it assumed the mission, personnel and Boeing B-52D Stratofortress bombers of the 326th Bombardment Squadron.   Most of the squadron deployed to the Western Pacific, where the flew Operation Arc Light combat missions over Southeast Asia, flying missions from Andersen Air Force Base between 11 September 1966 and 31 March 1967 and from Kadena Air Base between 15 February and 30 April 1968, operating as part of the Bombardment Wing, Provisional, 4133d.  Upon returning from its last deployment the squadron became non-operational and was inactivated on 25 June 1968 as Glasgow closed.

Expeditionary operations
The squadron was converted to provisional status on 22 July 2010 and redesignated the 322nd Expeditionary Reconnaissance Squadron and assigned to Air Combat Command to activate or inactivate as needed for continency operations.

Lineage
 Constituted as the 322d Bombardment Squadron (Heavy) on 28 January 1942
 Activated on 15 April 1942
 Redesignated 322d Bombardment Squadron, Heavy on 20 August 1943
 Inactivated on 7 November 1945
 Redesignated 322d Strategic Reconnaissance Squadron, Medium on 23 May 1950
 Activated on 6 July 1950
 Inactivated on 8 November 1957
 Redesignated 322d Bombardment Squadron, Heavy and activated on 15 November 1962 (not organized)
 Organized on 1 February 1963
 Inactivated on 25 June 1968
 Redesignated 322d Expeditionary Reconnaissance Squadron on 22 July 2010

Assignments
 91st Bombardment Group, 15 April 1942 – 7 November 1945
 91st Strategic Reconnaissance Group, 6 July 1950
 91st Strategic Reconnaissance Wing, 28 May 1952 – 8 November 1957
 Strategic Air Command, 15 November 1962 (not organized)
 91st Bombardment Wing, 1 February 1963 – 25 June 1968
 Air Combat Command to activate or inactivate as needed

Stations
 Harding Field, Louisiana, 15 April 1942
 MacDill Field, Florida, 13 May 1942
 Walla Walla Army Air Base, Washington, 22 June - 24 August 1942
 RAF Kimbolton (Station 117), England, 13 September 1942 (ground echelon), early October 1942 (air echelon)
 RAF Bassingbourn (Station 121), England, 14 October 1942 – 22 June 1945
 Drew Field, Florida, 3 July - 7 November 1945
 Barksdale Air Force Base, Louisiana, 6 July 1950
 Lockbourne Air Force Base, Ohio, 11 September 1951 – 8 November 1957
 Glasgow Air Force Base, Montana, 1 February 1963 – 25 June 1968

Aircraft
 Boeing B-17 Flying Fortress, 1942–1945
 Boeing RB-29 Superfortress, 1950
 North American RB-45C Tornado, 1950–1953
 Boeing RB-47E Stratojet, 1953–1957
 Boeing B-52D Stratofortress, 1963–1968

Awards and campaigns

References

Notes
 Explanatory notes

 Citations

Bibliography

See also

 List of B-52 Units of the United States Air Force
 B-17 Flying Fortress units of the United States Army Air Forces
 List of B-47 units of the United States Air Force

Reconnaissance squadrons of the United States Air Force
United States Air Force units and formations in the Korean War